Czech Lion Award for Best Cinematography is award given to the Czech film with best Cinematography.

Winners

External links

Awards for best cinematography
Czech Lion Awards
Awards established in 1993